Orders, decorations, and medals of Germany include:

History
 Orders, decorations, and medals of the German Empire
 Orders, decorations, and medals of East Germany
 Orders, decorations, and medals of Nazi Germany
Orders, decorations, and medals of the Federal Republic of Germany

Present day

 Orders, decorations, and medals of the German states
 Awards and decorations of the German Armed Forces
 List of honours of Germany awarded to heads of state and royalty
 Order of Merit of the Federal Republic of Germany
 List of recipients of the Order of Merit of the Federal Republic of Germany